The Type R is a marque of special performance Honda cars.

Type R or R Type may also refer to:

In automotive:
 Audi Type R, a 1930s car
 Bentley R Type, a 1950s car
 MG R-type, a 1930s car
 Renault R-Type engine, a 2010s straight-4 diesel

In other transportation:
 VicRail R type carriage, Australian rail carriage
 Lohner Type R, a WWI flying boat from Austria-Hungary
 Type R ship, a WWII U.S. Navy ship classification for refrigerated cargo ships

In science:
 R-type asteroid, a type of main-belt asteroid
 R-type calcium channel (cellular biology)

In videogames:
 R-Type, a video game series:
 R-Type, 1987
 R-Type II, 1989
 Super R-Type, 1991
 R-Type Leo, 1992
 R-Type III: The Third Lightning, 1993
 R-Type Delta, 1999
 R-Type Final, 2003
 R-Type Tactics, 2007
 R-Type Tactics II: Operation Bitter Chocolate, 2009

In other uses:
 R-type instruction format for machine code, see MIPS architecture
 Type R print, reverse chromogenic print process

See also
 R (disambiguation)
 R class (disambiguation)
 Model R (disambiguation)
 Honda R engine, a 2000s inline-four engine 
 Mack R series, a Class 8 heavy-duty truck
 International Harvester R-Series, 1950s truck